The Johnny Mannah Cup is a trophy contested annually in a game between the National Rugby League's Parramatta Eels and Cronulla-Sutherland Sharks clubs.

Background
The trophy was introduced in the 2013 NRL season to commemorate Johnny Mannah following his death in January 2013 from Hodgkin's lymphoma, as Mannah had played for both clubs during his short career.

Head-to-head

Results

See also
 Jon Mannah – The player after whom this Cup is named.
 Tim Mannah – The older brother of Johnny, who also played for the Parramatta Eels for 11 years: 2009–2019. During this time the Eels team he was a part of successfully won this Cup three times: 2013, 2014, & 2019.

References

Rugby league trophies and awards
Parramatta Eels matches
Cronulla-Sutherland Sharks matches
Rugby league rivalries
Rugby league in Sydney
Recurring sporting events established in 2013
2013 establishments in Australia
Sports rivalries in Australia